The Taipei Metro Xiaonanmen station (formerly transliterated as Hsiao Nanmen Station until 2003) is an underground station on the Xiaonanmen line located in Zhongzheng District, Taipei, Taiwan.

Station overview

This two-level, underground station has an island platform and four exits. The station is surrounded by government buildings and educational institutions, serving mainly students and civil servants, therefore it remains relatively quiet for most of the day.

In 2010, the station was used for the filming of a scene for a Taiwanese romantic comedy film, Au Revoir Taipei (一頁台北). The station was emptied for filming and a train was arranged specifically for shooting.

History
31 August 2000: The station opened for revenue service.
March 2006: The station was a target of serial vandalism where three of its exits were found to have had their glass panels smashed.

Operations
The station was formerly served by a shuttle service between Ximen and CKS Memorial Hall. Platform 1 and 2 would switch service every 6 months under that operation. Upon the opening of the Xinyi Line in November 2013, the shuttle was extended south to Taipower Building. Upon the opening of the Songshan Line in November 2014, the shuttle was replaced by trains running the full-length Songshan–Xindian line service between Songshan and Xindian.

Station layout

Exits
Exit 1: North side of Aiguo W. Rd., near Yanping S. Rd., adjacent to the Ministry of National Defense
Exit 2: South side of Aiguo W. Rd., near Yanping S. Rd.
Exit 3: Southeast side of the intersection of Aiguo W. Rd. and Boai Rd. 
Exit 4: Southwest side of the intersection of Aiguo W. Rd. and Chongqing S. Rd.

Around the station
 Ministry of National Defense
 Judicial Yuan
 Ministry of the Interior National Immigration Agency General Headquarters and Taipei Service Station
 Taipei Fucheng
 Sun Yun-suan Memorial Museum
 Chunghwa Postal Museum
 Ministry of Justice
 National Museum of History 
 Taipei Botanical Garden
 Taipei Municipal University of Education
 Environmental Protection Administration (between this station and Ximen station)
 Soochow University (Downtown Campus)
 Taipei Municipal Jianguo High School
 Nanmen Junior High School
 Presidential Office Building

References

2000 establishments in Taiwan
Railway stations opened in 2000
Songshan–Xindian line stations